The 2009 Chinese Figure Skating Championships were held on 7–10 January 2009 at the Beijing Capital Gymnasium in Beijing. Skaters competed in the disciplines of men's singles, ladies' singles, pair skating, and ice dancing. In addition to the short program and free skating, single skaters also performed a 3:30 minute interpretive exhibition program, for which music with vocals was permitted. The results were among the criteria used to choose the Chinese teams to the 2009 World Championships, the 2009 Four Continents Championships, and the 2009 World Junior Championships.

These Championships were distinct from the National Games of China, although they served to qualify some skaters for the National Games. Some of the top Chinese pair skaters did not participate in the national championships, preferring to compete solely at the National Games instead, for which they received byes.

Results

Men

Ladies

Pairs

Ice dancing

References
  (2009-08-01) 

Chinese Figure Skating Championships
Chinese Figure Skating Championships, 2009